Joseph Chabanceau de La Barre (21 May 1633, in Paris – 6 May 1678, in Paris) was a French composer, notably of the air de cour.

He was son of Pierre Chabanceau de La Barre (1592–1656), organist of the chapelle royale at Notre-Dame, sieur of La Barre, and younger brother of Charles-Henry Chabanceau de La Barre (1625-?), player of the spinet to the queen, and Anne Chabanceau de La Barre (1628–1688), a noted soprano.

He received the pension as an abbé in 1674 only four years prior to his death.

Works, editions and recordings
 Airs à deux parties avec les seconds couplets en diminution, Robert Ballard, and son Christophe Ballard, Paris 1669
four pieces in the Bauyn Manuscript (Paris, Bibliothèque Nationale. Catalogue number Rés. Vm7 674–675)
 various airs published in journals such as the Mercure galant and collections.
Recording
 Airs à deux parties Stephan Van Dyck, Stephen Stubbs, Ricercar Belgium, 1998.

References

French Baroque composers
French male composers
French classical organists
French male organists
1633 births
1678 deaths
Musicians from Paris
17th-century classical composers
17th-century male musicians
Male classical organists